() is a Japanese casual wear designer, manufacturer and retailer. The company is a wholly owned subsidiary of Fast Retailing Co., Ltd.

History

Origins in Japan
A Yamaguchi-based company, Ogori Shōji (which, until then, had been operating men's clothing shops called "Men's Shop OS") was founded in March 1949 in Ube, Yamaguchi.

On 2 June 1984, it opened a unisex casual wear store in Fukuro-machi, Naka-ku, Hiroshima, under the name "Unique Clothing Warehouse". Initially, the brand was going to be registered as a shortened contraction of "unique clothing". However, in 1988, during administration work in Hong Kong for registering the brand, staff in charge of registration misread the "C" as "Q", and that is how the brand name was born. Tadashi Yanai then changed the store name to "uniqlo" across Japan. In September 1991, the name of the company was changed from "Ogori Shōji" to "Fast Retailing", and by April 1994, there were over 100 Uniqlo stores operating throughout Japan.

Private-label strategy
In 1997, Fast Retailing adopted a set of strategies from American retailer The Gap, known as "SPA" (for specialty-store/retailer of private-label apparel), meaning that they would produce their own clothing and sell it exclusively. They engaged the retail brand consultancy, CIA, Inc./The Brand Architect Group, to guide the company through the realization of this strategy, including consulting on merchandise, visual merchandising and display, store design and a new logo designed by Richard Seireeni and Sy Chen of The Brand Architect Group's Los Angeles office. Uniqlo had begun outsourcing their clothing manufacturing to factories in China where labour was cheap, a well-established corporate practice. Japan was in the depths of a recession at the time, and the low-cost goods proved popular. Their advertising campaigns, clothing quality and new retail layouts also proved fruitful.

In November 1998, it opened their first urban Uniqlo store in Tokyo's trendy Harajuku district, and outlets soon spread to major cities throughout Japan. In 2001, sales turnover and gross profit reached a new peak, with over 500 retail stores in Japan. When Uniqlo decided to expand overseas, it separated Uniqlo from the parent company, and established Fast Retailing (Jiangsu) Apparel Co., Ltd. in China. In 2002, their first Chinese Uniqlo outlet was opened in Shanghai along with four overseas outlets in London, England.

On 1 November 2005, Fast Retailing transferred the business related to clothing manufacturing and retailing to Sun Road Co., Ltd., a wholly owned subsidiary that operated golf courses through a company split (absorption-type split), and became a holding company. On the same day, Sun Road changed its name to Uniqlo Co., Ltd.

2005 saw more overseas expansion, with stores opening in the United States (New York City), Hong Kong (Tsim Sha Tsui) and South Korea (Seoul), their South Korean expansion being part of a joint venture with Lotte. As of year-end 2005, in addition to its overseas holdings, Uniqlo had around 700 stores within Japan. By 2006, sales were $4 billion. By April 2007, the company had set a global sales goal of $10 billion and a ranking among the top five global retailers, joining what at the time was Gap, H&M, Inditex and Limited Brands.

Fast Retailing signed a design consulting contract for Uniqlo products with fashion designer Jil Sander in March 2009. Shiatzy Chen was approached by Uniqlo to produce a capsule collection of ready-to-wear pieces to launch in November 2010, while Asia's largest Uniqlo store outside Japan opened its doors in Kuala Lumpur in the same month.

On 2 September 2009, Fast Retailing announced that the company would target annual group sales of 5 trillion yen (approx. US$61.2 billion) and pretax profit from operations of 1 trillion yen (approx. US$12.2 billion) by 2020. This means that the company is aiming to become the world's biggest specialty retailer of private label apparel with a continuous growth rate of 20% per year. The figure breaks down as one trillion yen from Uniqlo's Japan business, three trillion yen from its international business, and one trillion yen from  The company's international business target breaks down as one trillion yen in China, one trillion in other Asian countries and one trillion in Europe and the United States.

In October 2018, Uniqlo collaborated with designer Alexander Wang to create a line of Heattech layerable basics including tank tops, leggings, underwear and bodysuits.

On 3 June 2019,  artist and recent Dior Homme collaborator KAWS participed on KAWS x UNIQLO UT. "Perhaps because all the other collections were the subdued Uniqlo trademark, KAWS’s subversive art was able to stand out all the more."

In November 2022, Uniqlo opens a new remake and repair service in Tokyo. Re. Uniqlo Repair Studio, offers same day repairs and custom remakes of clothing purchased at Uniqlo. It is open for a trial run until 31 March 2023. This was previously introduced at stores in Germany, the UK and US.

Logo

International operations

By August 2023, the company forecasts it will operate 3,747 stores worldwide.

Australia

Uniqlo opened its first Australian store in Melbourne in April 2014. It expanded into Queensland the following year, with the introduction of two shops in Brisbane. Uniqlo opened a shop in Chadstone Shopping Centre in Melbourne, Victoria, the largest shopping centre in the southern hemisphere, in October 2016 when it was redeveloped. There are currently 25 stores in Australia, including in Perth, Brisbane, Melbourne and Sydney. There is also a Uniqlo store in the Eastland Shopping Centre in Ringwood, Victoria.

Bangladesh
Uniqlo started its first store in Dhaka, Bangladesh, on 5 July 2013. There it is known as Grameen Uniqlo, owing to its social business concept joint venture with Grameen Bank. There are currently 14 stores in Dhaka, one store each in Gazipur, Narsingdi and Narayanganj.

Belgium
The first Belgian Uniqlo store opened in October 2015 at Meir, Antwerp. A second store followed at the Wijnegem Shopping Center on 25 March in the same year. 19 October 2017 saw the opening of a third store in Brussels. There were 4 stores in Belgium as of 31 August 2021.

Canada

Uniqlo opened their first Canadian store at the Toronto Eaton Centre on 30 September 2016, followed by a second store at the Yorkdale Shopping Centre on 20 October 2016. Measuring at 28,000 and 24,000 square feet, both stores are five times the size of the Muji store that opened in Toronto in 2014. Three new stores in Ontario opened in 2018 at Vaughan Mills, CF Markville and Square One Shopping Centre. Uniqlo opened the new Oshawa location at the Oshawa Centre in March 2019 and opened the new Newmarket location at the Upper Canada Mall in April 2019, bringing the total number of stores in Ontario to seven. A third Canadian store, the first outside of Ontario and the first in Western Canada, opened at Burnaby's Metropolis at Metrotown in October 2017  to be followed by Surrey's Guildford Town Centre and Richmond Centre in Richmond, BC. A new store opened at Coquitlam Centre in Coquitlam, BC on 14 September 2018. A new West Edmonton Mall store opened on 27 September 2019. A location opened on 23 October 2020 at the Montreal Eaton Centre in part of the former Eaton's store (and later Les Ailes de la Mode), the first Uniqlo location in Quebec. There are 14 stores in Canada as of 31 August 2021. Uniqlo plans to open a store in Ottawa in June 2023.

China

Uniqlo entered the Chinese mainland market in 2002. As of August 2021, there were 832 stores in China, including in Beijing, Guangzhou, Chongqing, Chengdu, Nanjing, Ningbo, Shanghai, Shenzhen, Shijia, Tianjin and Xi'an. "Given the population of 1.3 billion, I think we can go for about 3,000 stores," Fast Retailing chief Tadashi Yanai told The Nikkei in 2020, indicating plans to continue opening locations in the world's most populous country.

In May 2011, the magazine Shukan Bunshun published a story alleging that Uniqlo had forced employees at its stores and factories in China to work long hours for little pay.  In response, Uniqlo unsuccessfully sued the weekly's publisher, Bungeishunjū, for ¥220 million for libel.

A 2015 online video of a couple having sex in a Beijing Uniqlo store changing room became notorious among Chinese internet users. Chinese police arrested at least five people in connection with the incident, allegedly including the couple and three other disseminators of the video, for having 'severely violated socialist core values'. The New York Times noted that the store's exterior had become a popular venue for people to gather and take pictures in sexual poses reminiscent of the video.

France
As of August 2021, there were 23 stores in France. On 17 November 2014, Uniqlo opened its first store in eastern France (and the second store in France outside Greater Paris) in the city of Strasbourg.

Germany
Uniqlo's German flagship store opened on 11 April 2014 at Tauentzienstraße, Berlin. By 2021 the company operated 10 stores in Germany, 6 of those in Berlin.

India 
Uniqlo opened a store in India in October 2019, following the company's announcement about the same on 9 May 2018. The company will set up a wholly owned subsidiary in India.

As of August 2021, there were 6 stores in India.

Indonesia

On 22 June 2013, Uniqlo opened its first Indonesian store at Lotte Shopping Avenue, Jakarta. It has 56 stores as of December 2022, spreading east to Balikpapan, Bandung, Banjarmasin, Denpasar, Makassar, Manado, Mataram, Pontianak, Samarinda, Semarang, Surakarta, Surabaya and Yogyakarta, and west to Batam, Lampung, Medan, Palembang and Pekanbaru. On 9 April 2021, its Indonesian flagship and most iconic store opened at Pondok Indah Mall 3, Jakarta. On 28 October 2022, Uniqlo opened its first roadside store in Indonesia at Heritage Lifestyle Hub in Bandung, West Java, thus became the sixth country outside Japan to get a Uniqlo roadside store. The second Uniqlo roadside store in Indonesia will open in Metland Cyber City in Tangerang, Banten in May 2023.

Malaysia

On 4 November 2010, Uniqlo opened its first store in Malaysia, in Fahrenheit 88 located in Bukit Bintang, Kuala Lumpur. As of October 2021, Uniqlo now has 48 outlets located across Malaysia, including an online store. Malaysia became the fifth country outside Japan to get a Uniqlo roadside store. The 15,100-square feet store, located in Bandar Sri Damansara was opened in December 2020.

Netherlands
The first Dutch Uniqlo store was opened at the Kalverstraat in Amsterdam on 28 September 2018. The official opening was marred by protests against Uniqlo's unethical business practices in its factory in Jakarta, Indonesia. As of August 2021, a second score was opened at the Grote Marktstraat in The Hague.

Philippines
Uniqlo's first store in the Philippines opened at the SM Mall of Asia on 15 June 2012. On its sixth anniversary, the company opened its flagship store in the country at Glorietta 5 in Makati, it opened on 5 October 2018. The store is the biggest in Southeast Asia.

Uniqlo had 60 stores across the Philippines as of October 2019. It has partnered with the SM Group's SM Retail Inc. to bring the brand to the Philippines. As of August 2021, there were 63 stores in Philippines.

Poland
In October 2022, Uniqlo opened its first Polish store in Warsaw's Junior shopping centre. The store covers 1,500 square meters on two floors.

South Korea

In November 2011, Uniqlo generated more than 2 billion won ($1.7 million) in one day's sales on 11 November when it opened Asia's largest flagship store in central Seoul. The sales figure was the highest ever set by a fashion outlet in Korea. Uniqlo sales over US$1.2 billion with 150 shops in South Korea. Lotte owns 49% of Uniqlo's Korean subdiary. It currently operates 134. stores in South Korea.

On 6 December 2020, the flagship store in Myeong-dong was closed due to low sales from COVID-19 and anti-Japanese protests.

Singapore
As of 2022, Uniqlo had 27 stores in Singapore. Uniqlo opened its first store in Singapore on 9 April 2009 in Tampines 1, which has been closed down on 17 January 2021 and instead, a new store at Tampines Mall was opened on 5 February 2021 and has the similar format as Bugis+, ION Orchard, JEM, Orchard Central and Plaza Singapura which has two floors, one for men and one for women. The first Global Flagship Store opened on 2 September 2016 at Orchard Central replacing 313 @ Somerset. Numerous expansion plans were unveiled in 2020 and Uniqlo ION Orchard and Plaza Singapura, were also heavily expanded and is called "Uniqlotown" for Orchard Road.

Spain
Uniqlo began operations in Spain in 2016 with its online store, and in September 2017 opened its flagship store in Barcelona (Passeig de Gràcia). It also owns two more stores in Barcelona and one store in Madrid. As of August 2021, there were 5 stores in Spain.

Taiwan

Uniqlo opened its first store in Taiwan on 5 October 2010 at Hankyu Department Store in Taipei. As of June 2022, there are 70 stores in Taiwan.

Thailand
Uniqlo open first store in Thailand on 9 September 2011 at Central World. As of January 2023, there were 62 stores in Thailand.

United Kingdom
As of 2021, Uniqlo had 15 shops in England. Ambitious expansion plans in the early 2000s were reversed, with 16 shops being closed in 2003, including those in Manchester, Coventry, and Leicester. Uniqlo opened a brand new shop in Manchester on Market Street in April 2019.

United States

In September 2005, Uniqlo opened its first United States store in the Menlo Park Mall located in Edison, New Jersey. In November 2006, Uniqlo opened its first global flagship store in the SoHo fashion district of Manhattan, New York City. New fashion designers joined the store's team to boost and rebirth fashion concepts catering to the US market.

As part of Fast Retailing's 2020 plan, the company has stated that it plans to generate $10 billion in annual sales in the United States from 200 stores, which will lead to a location in every major U.S. city. This goal was stated when the company's only U.S. presence was its handful of stores in the New York City area, soon after the company began an expansion in the United States.

In October 2015, Uniqlo opened its first store in the Midwest with a Chicago store on Michigan Avenue.

In October 2019, Uniqlo signed a lease for its first North American distribution center in Phillipsburg, NJ, leasing a space of over 950,000 sq ft. As of August 2021, there were 43 stores in USA.

Vietnam 
On 17 October 2019, Uniqlo officially arranged the first store in Vietnam, which is expected to open at the end of 2019 in District 1, the center of Ho Chi Minh City. Located on a corner of Le Thanh Ton and Dong Khoi streets, UNIQLO Dong Khoi is located right in front of Parkson Saigon Tourist Plaza, one of the most popular and widely known shopping destinations.

As of April 2022, there were 11 stores in Vietnam.

Controversies

In January 2015, a number of labor rights violations were reported at Uniqlo suppliers in China. Uniqlo pledged to remedy the violations.

In June 2015, Chinese Uniqlo factory workers were permitted by the Chinese Communist Party regime to demonstrate after a factory closure.

In November 2015, investigations into the measures Uniqlo introduced in the wake of the January 2015 revelations found that the remedies had been only partially successful, with significant violations continuing to occur.

In October 2016, the report This Way to Dystopia: Exposing UNIQLO's Abuse of Chinese Garment Workers by SACOM and War on Want claimed that it was still the case that "excessive overtime, low pay, dangerous working conditions and oppressive management" were common in Uniqlo factories in China and Cambodia.

In 2019, a number of Australian workers reported that bullying and harassment is rife, there were "shouting rooms", and a toxic work culture. They claimed they had to work 18-hour days, had to fold seven shirts per minute, and that everyone leaves with "some form of PTSD".

Also in 2019, an international Uniqlo advert was uniquely subtitled for the South Korean market in a manner widely perceived there to have trivialized the trauma of comfort women.

In January 2021, Uniqlo shirts were blocked at the US border over concerns of violations related to a ban on cotton products produced in the Xinjiang region of China due to reports of forced labour. A protest was filed by Uniqlo's parent company Fast Retailing, but was denied.

At the onset of the 2022 Russian invasion of Ukraine, Fast Retailing initially decided to remain in the Russian market, saying that clothing is a "necessity of life". Following backlash, on 10 March 2022 the company announced to stop operating in Russia, citing "a number of difficulties, including operational challenges and the worsening of the conflict situation."

"Art for All" partnership with Jeffrey Deitch 
Launched in January 2017, "Art for All" was a partnership with New York art dealer and curator Jeffrey Deitch. The project involved selling, for under $100 per item, 65 limited-edition products made by commissioned artists such as Marie Roberts, Starlee Kine and Ken Kagami.

Awards
The German fashion designer Jil Sander joined Uniqlo in 2009, and was appointed creative director of the brand's menswear and womenswear – as well as launching a new label, +J collection, which won the 2011 Brit Insurance Design Fashion Award.

References

External links 
 

Fast Retailing
Clothing brands of Japan
Clothing companies of Japan
Clothing retailers of Japan
Companies based in Yamaguchi Prefecture
Japanese brands
Japanese companies established in 1949
Clothing companies established in 1949
Retail companies established in 1949
Retail companies based in Tokyo
Manufacturing companies based in Tokyo
Sportswear brands